The 1974 Virginia Slims of San Francisco was a women's tennis tournament that took place on indoor carpet courts at the Civic Auditorium in San Francisco in the United States. It was the fourth edition of the event, which was part of the Virginia Slims Circuit, and was held from January 14 through January 19, 1974. Second-seeded Billie Jean King won the singles title, her third after 1971 and 1972, and earned $10,000 first-prize money.

Finals

Singles
 Billie Jean King  defeated  Chris Evert 7–6(5–2), 6–2

Doubles
 Chris Evert /  Billie Jean King defeated  Françoise Dürr /  Betty Stöve 6–4, 6–2

Prize money

References

VS of San Francisco
VS of San Francisco
Silicon Valley Classic
Virginia Slims of San Francisco
Virginia Slims of San Francisco